Tendring First is a local political party operating throughout Tendring, Essex, England. They field candidates for Tendring District Council Frinton and Walton Town Council and Essex County Council. They currently have 4 district councillors on Tendring District Council and hold 10 seats on Frinton & Walton Town Council. They had 1 county councillor on Essex County Council between 2013 and 2016. They do not operate in parliamentary or European elections.

Background
The party was founded after Terry Allen, the then Conservative leader of the Tendring District Council, was suspended as a Conservative by his central office, along with two other members, and after appealing unsuccessfully against the decision resigned to set up a new political group. They were subsequently joined by Essex County Councillors Mark Cossens and Pierre Oxley.

Election Results

Borough Council elections

County Council elections 

Tendring First have been represented on Essex County Council from its foundation to the 2009 election, where both sitting members lost their seats to Conservatives. In 2013 Oxley regained his Clacton East seat before he resigned after given a suspended jail term for fraud.

References

Tendring
Politics of Essex
Locally based political parties in England